Navarretia prolifera is a species of flowering plant in the phlox family known by the common names bur pincushionplant and yellow bur navarretia. It is endemic to the Sierra Nevada foothills of California, where it grows near running water.

Description
Navarretia prolifera is an annual herb with branching or whorled spreading stems up to about 16 centimetres in height. The leaves are threadlike or divided into threadlike lobes. The inflorescence is a cluster of flowers surrounded by hairy leaflike bracts divided into pointed, needlelike lobes. The flower is about a centimeter long. There are two subspecies of the plant, ssp. lutea bearing yellow flowers and ssp. prolifera with yellow-throated purple flowers. The less common ssp. lutea is known only from El Dorado County, California.

External links
Jepson Manual Treatment - Navarretia prolifera
Photo gallery: ssp. lutea
Photo gallery: ssp. prolifera

prolifera
Endemic flora of California
Flora of the Sierra Nevada (United States)
Natural history of the California chaparral and woodlands
Flora without expected TNC conservation status